Danneberg is a German surname. Notable people with the surname include:

Robert Danneberg (1882-1942), Austrian politician
Thomas Danneberg (born 1942), German actor

Sports 
Jochen Danneberg (born 1953), East German ski jumper
Rolf Danneberg (born 1953), German athlete in field events
Tim Danneberg (born 1986), German footballer

See also
Dannenberg (disambiguation)

German-language surnames